This Is Football Management is a sports video game developed by SCE Studios Soho and published by Sony Computer Entertainment for PlayStation Portable, PlayStation 3 and PlayStation Vita via PlayStation Network.

Reception
The PSP version received 5 out of 10 from PlayStation Official Magazine – UK.

References

External links

2010 video games
Association football management video games
Europe-exclusive video games
Multiplayer and single-player video games
PlayStation 3 games
PlayStation Portable games
PlayStation Network games
Sony Interactive Entertainment games
This Is Football
Video games developed in the United Kingdom